The University of Bristol Spelæological Society (UBSS) was founded in 1919 by cavers in the University of Bristol.  Among its earliest activities was the archaeological excavation of Aveline's Hole.

The club owns a hut, which was formerly a ladies' cricket pavilion. It was bought in 1919 for £5 and moved from its original plot to Burrington Combe, where it still stands.

Publications and library
The club maintains one of the largest collections of caving books and journals in the country in its library in Bristol, as well as publishing the long-standing academic journal, Proceedings of the University of Bristol Spelæological Society.

Following numerous expeditions to the Burren, County Clare over the years, the UBSS has published the definitive guides to the caves of the region: Caves of Northwest Clare (1969), Caves of County Clare (1981), Caves of County Clare & South Galway (2003), Caves of Mid-West Ireland (2019) and Caves of southern Ireland (2022).

Notable members
Notable past members of the club include Professor E. K. Tratman, who gave his name to Tratman's Temple in Swildon's Hole and to the 'Tratman Award', respected Irish spelæologist J. C. Coleman, and baking star Kim-Joy Hewlett.

See also 

Cambridge University Caving Club
 Caving in the United Kingdom

References

Further reading

External links
 UBSS club website

Student societies in the United Kingdom
Caving organisations in the United Kingdom
1919 establishments in England
Sports organizations established in 1919
University of Bristol